Daniel Heymann (born 1949) is an argentine economist. He studied physics and economics in Universidad de Buenos Aires. He later had a PhD at UCLA. His mentor was Axel Leijonhufvud. He worked at CEPAL. He won the Konex Award from Argentina.

Books
 High Inflation: The Arne Ryde Memorial Lectures (1995) (together with Leijonhufvud Heymann and Axel Leijonhufvud)
 A Study in Economic Instability: The Case of Argentina (1983)
 Las fluctuaciones de la industria manufacturera argentina, 1950-1978 (1980)
 Life After Debt (2014) (edited with Joseph Stiglitz)
 Economía de Fronteras Abiertas. Exploraciones en Sistemas Sociales Complejos (with Perazzo and Zimmermann)

References

http://iiep-baires.econ.uba.ar/integrante/heymann_daniel

Argentine economists
1949 births
Living people